Uncia may refer to:

 Uncia (coin), an ancient Roman bronze coin
 Uncia (length), an ancient Roman unit of length
 An ancient Roman unit of mass roughly equivalent to the ounce
 Uncia (mine), a Bolivian tin mine
 Uncia (genus), the former genus of the Snow Leopard, a large cat native to the mountain ranges of central Asia